Haplotaxidae is a family of earthworms of the Haplotaxida order.

Genera

Alphadrilus Brinkhurst, 1988
Delaya Brinkhurst, 1988
Haplotaxis Hoffmeister, 1843
Hologynus Brinkhurst, 1988
Metataxis Righi, 1985
Omodeodrilus Kammerer, 2006
Pelodrilus Beddard, 1891

References

Haplotaxida
Annelid families